Anurupa Debi (9 September 1882 – 19 April 1958) (also known as, Anurupa Devi) was one of the most reputed female novelists in Bengali literature in the British colonial era. She was also an eminent short story writer, poet as well as a social worker. Debi was one of the first female writers in Bengali literature to gain considerable prominence and popularity.

Personal life 
Anurupa Debi was born on 9 September 1882 to then Deputy Magistrate and writer, Mukunda Mukhopadhyay and Dhorasundari Debi at her maternal uncle's house at Shyambazar, Calcutta (now, Kolkata). Social reformer, Bhudeb Mukhopadhyay was her paternal grandfather. Her maternal grandfather, Nagendranath Bandopadhyay was one of the founder-members of famous Bangiya Natyashala. Her elder sister Surupa Devi (1879-1922) was also an famous novelist of her time who used to write in her pseudonym, Indira Devi.

At the age of ten, she married Shikharnath Bandopadhyay, in Chinsura, Hooghly. They passed a vast period of their life in Muzaffarpur, Bihar.

Education 
Due to severe physical illness in her childhood, Anurupa Debi started to learn a little late. While she was bedridden, her elder sister Surupa Devi used to recite Kashidasi Mahabharata and Krittivasi Ramayana to pass their leisure time. Also, according to rules of their family, during their Grandpa's leisure time, they would sit next to him and listen to one chapter of Mahabharata and Ramayana each day. As a result, Anurupa Debi easily absorbed that subject in her mind. In this context, she said, "Even though at that time I was illiterate, but it cannot be said that I was uneducated, as I memorised most of the stories of Ramayana-Mahabharata. At that time I was of 7."

Her elder sisters used to practice writing poetry by reading Sanskrit poems from their Grandpa. Thus, she also became educated in her childhood under the patronage of their Grandpa, Bhudeb Mukhopadhyay and father Mukunda Mukhopadhyay. She had a special fondness for education and learning since her childhood. Besides Bengali, she earned considerable mastery in Sanskrit and Hindi. She used to study to a lot of books of various Western Scholars and therefore became acquainted with Western science and philosophy.

Literary Works 
Till the mid-19th century, Indian women were deprived from education and people used to restrict them only within household chores, as they remained largely uneducated. It was seen as a social 'crime' for them to be educated or to achieve basic level of education. They didn't have equal rights at all. In the context of severe gender discrimination, Debi broke the chain and established herself as an eminent Bengali novelist, writer and poet of her time.

Once in her childhood, her elder sister Surupa Devi sent her letters on colorful papers in form of poetry. Reading that letter Anurupa Devi became confused how should she reply. When she asked her Grandpa for advice, Bhudeb babu insisted her to write the reply in form of poetry. On advice of her Grandpa, Anurupa Devi wrote a reply letter in form of poetry as given below:

This poem is known to be the very first composition of Anurupa Debi. In her words, 

She successfully composed Markandeya Chandi in a poem and the starting chapter of Valmiki Ramayana before the age of only 10.

Debi used not to reveal her initial literary endeavors to anyone except her elder sister, Surupa Devi, who used to write in her pseudonym, Indira Devi. Her first piece of work got published in Kuntalin Purashkar Granthamala with the pseudonym, Rani Devi.

Critical reception
In 2013, Swapna Dutta writes for The Hindu, Anurupa "ruthlessly pointed out the evils of the prevalent social code," and "Nearly all her novels were made into successful stage plays and films."

Notable Works

Awards 
Kuntalin Puraskar for the first published story
1919: Sri Bharat Dharma Mahamandal awarded her the title of 'Dharma Chandrika'.
1935: Jagattarini Gold Medal by Calcutta University

References

External links

Notes

1882 births
1958 deaths
Bengali writers
Bengali novelists
Bengali Hindus
20th-century Bengalis
19th-century Bengalis
Indian writers
19th-century Indian writers
19th-century Indian women writers
20th-century Indian writers
20th-century Indian women writers
Indian novelists
Indian women novelists
20th-century Indian novelists
19th-century Indian novelists
Indian poets
Indian women poets
19th-century Indian poets
20th-century Indian poets
Indian short story writers
Indian women short story writers
20th-century Indian short story writers
19th-century Indian short story writers
Indian autobiographers
Indian essayists
Indian women essayists
20th-century Indian essayists
19th-century Indian essayists
Indian social workers
Writers from Kolkata
Women writers from West Bengal